Amos Alonzo Stagg (August 16, 1862 – March 17, 1965) was an American athlete and college coach in multiple sports, primarily American football. His undefeated Chicago Maroons teams of 1905 and 1913 were recognized as national champions. He was also the head basketball coach for one season at Chicago (1920–1921), and the Maroons' head baseball coach for twenty seasons (1893–1905, 1907–1913).

At Chicago, Stagg also instituted an annual prep basketball tournament and track meet. Both drew the top high school teams and athletes from around the United States.

Stagg played football as an end at Yale University and was selected to the first All-America Team in 1889. He was inducted into the College Football Hall of Fame as both a player and a coach in the charter class of 1951 and was the only individual honored in both roles until the 1990s. Influential in other sports, Stagg developed basketball as a five-player sport. This five-man concept allowed his 10 (later 11) man football team the ability to compete with each other and to stay in shape over the winter. Stagg was elected to the Basketball Hall of Fame in its first group of inductees in 1959, and was elected Fellow #71 in the National Academy of Kinesiology (formerly American Academy of Physical Education) in 1946.

Stagg also forged a bond between sports and religious faith early in his career that remained important to him for the rest of his life.

Early years
Stagg was born in a poor Irish neighborhood of West Orange, New Jersey, and attended Phillips Exeter Academy.

Yale

Stagg entered Yale University in 1884 and received his bachelor's degree in 1888. He spent two additional years at Yale studying in the Divinity School under William Rainey Harper before deciding he could have more influence on young men through coaching than through the pulpit. He was very active in the Yale YMCA where he served as general secretary during his last two years.

Baseball
Stagg was a pitcher at Yale; he declined the offers to play for six different professional baseball teams. He nonetheless influenced the game through his invention of the batting cage.

Football
Stagg played on the 1888 team, and was an end on the first All-America Team in 1889.

Springfield
Stagg later gave up his desire for the ministry and decided to become a coach and athletic director. He spent two years at the International YMCA Training School , now known as Springfield College, from 1890 to 1892.

Basketball
Basketball had been invented in 1891 by James Naismith, a teacher at the YMCA School in Springfield. On March 11, 1892, Stagg, still an instructor at the YMCA School, played in the first public game of basketball. A crowd of 200 watched as the student team defeated the faculty, 5–1. Stagg scored the only basket for the losing side. He popularized the five-player lineup on basketball teams.

Coaching career

Stagg became the first paid football coach at Williston Seminary, a secondary school, in 1890. This was also Stagg's first time receiving pay to coach football. He coached there one day a week while also coaching full-time at the International YMCA Training School. Stagg then coached at the University of Chicago from 1892 to 1932. He was the head football coach and director of the Department of Physical Culture. Eventually, university president Robert Maynard Hutchins forced out the 70-year-old Stagg, who he felt was too old to continue coaching.

At age 70, Stagg moved on to the College of the Pacific in Stockton, California, where he led the Tigers for 14 seasons, from 1933 through 1946, then was asked to resign. One of his players at Pacific in 1945-46 was Hall of Fame coach of Navy and Temple Wayne Hardin.

In the 1924 Summer Olympics in Paris, Stagg served as a coach with the U.S. Olympic Track and Field team. He played himself in the movie Knute Rockne, All American, released in 1940. From 1947 to 1952 he served as co-coach with his son, Amos Jr., at Susquehanna University in Pennsylvania. Stagg's final job was as kicking coach at the local junior college in Stockton, California, which was then known as Stockton College. "The Grand Old Man of Football" retired from Stockton College at the age of 96 and died in Stockton six years later.

Vegetarianism

Stagg was reportedly an activist for vegetarianism and banned his players from using alcohol and tobacco. In 1907, he trained his Chicago football team on a strict vegetarian diet. This was widely reported in newspapers and vegetarian literature.
Stagg had spent time at the vegetarian Battle Creek Sanitarium in 1907 and was inspired by John Harvey Kellogg's vegetarian diet. Although Stagg was cited in vegetarian literature as advocating a strict vegetarian diet throughout his life, in his memoir he stated that he was a vegetarian for only two years and did it in an attempt to relieve his chronic sciatic pain. Stagg did not consume alcohol, coffee, or cigarettes and promoted the consumption of vegetables over red meat.

Family
Stagg was married to the former Stella Robertson on September 10, 1894. The couple had three children: two sons, Amos Jr. and Paul, and a daughter, Ruth. Both sons played for the elder Stagg as quarterbacks at the University of Chicago and each later coached college football. In 1952, Barbara Stagg, Amos' granddaughter, started coaching the high school girls' basketball team for Northern Lehigh High School in Slatington, Pennsylvania.

Legacy

Two high schools in the United States, one in Palos Hills, Illinois, and the other in Stockton, California, and an elementary school in Chicago, Illinois, are named after Stagg. The NCAA Division III National Football Championship game, played in Salem, Virginia, is named the Stagg Bowl after him. The athletic stadium at Springfield College is named Stagg Field. The football field at Susquehanna University is named Amos Alonzo Stagg Field in honor of both Stagg Sr. and Jr. Stagg was also the namesake of the University of Chicago's old Stagg Field. At University of the Pacific in Stockton, California, one of the campus streets is known as Stagg Way and Pacific Memorial Stadium, the school's football and soccer stadium, was renamed Amos Alonzo Stagg Memorial Stadium on October 15, 1988. Phillips Exeter Academy also has a field named for him and a statue. A field in West Orange, New Jersey on Saint Cloud Avenue is also named for him. The Amos Alonzo Stagg Award is awarded annually to the "individual, group, or institution whose services have been outstanding in the advancement of the best interests of football." The winner of the Big Ten Football Championship Game, started in 2011, receives the Stagg Championship Trophy, named in his honor.

At the College of William and Mary, the Amos Alonzo Stagg Society was organized during 1979–1980 by students and faculty opposed to a plan by the institution's Board of Visitors to move William and Mary back into big-time college football several decades after a scandal there involving grade changes for football players. The Society was loosely organized but successful in combating, among other plans, a major expansion of the William and Mary football stadium.

Collections of Amos Alonzo Stagg's papers are held at the University of Chicago Library, Special Collections Research Center and at the University of the Pacific Library, Holt Atherton Department of Special Collections. The Alonzo Stagg 50/20 Hike goes through Arlington, Virginia, Washington, DC and Maryland.

The Stagg Tree, a giant sequoia in the Alder Creek Grove and the fifth largest tree in the world, is named in honor of Amos Alonzo Stagg. Stagg is also an elected Fellow in the National Academy of Kinesiology (née the American Academy of Physical Education).

Stagg Bowl
The Amos Alonzo Stagg Bowl, otherwise known as the NCAA Division III Football Championship Game since 1973, is competed annually as the final game of the NCAA Division III Football Tournament. The Stagg Bowl can be traced back to 1969, prior to the inception of the D-III national championship. At that time—from 1969 to 1973—the Stagg Bowl was one of two bowls competed at the College Division level—the Knute Rockne Bowl and the Amos Alonzo Stagg Bowl. In 1973, the NCAA instituted the D-III national championship, and the Stagg Bowl was adopted as the moniker for that game.

The first 10 Stagg Bowls were played in Phenix City, Alabama, from 1973 to 1982. Wittenberg University (Ohio) won the inaugural game via a 41–0 result over Juniata College (Pa.). The game moved to Kings Island, Ohio, for the 1983 and 1984 editions, with Augustana College (Ill.) winning the first two of its four straight NCAA titles.

The Stagg Bowl returned to Phenix City for five more years, before spending three seasons in Bradenton, Florida.

In 1993, the Stagg Bowl moved to Salem, Va., where it remained until 2017. The University of Mount Union (formerly Mount Union College) won the first of its NCAA Division III-record 13 football national championships in 1993. The Championship was held in Shenandoah, TX, in 2018 and 2019.

Tom Benson Hall of Fame Stadium at Hall of Fame Village powered by Johnson Controls in Canton, Ohio, was originally awarded the 2020 and 2021 Stagg Bowls; however, the 2020 Championship was cancelled due to the COVID-19 pandemic. The 2021 Stagg Bowl will be held at Tom Benson Hall of Fame Stadium December 2-4, 2021.

Innovations
The following is a list of innovations Stagg introduced to American football. Where known, the year of its first use is annotated in parentheses. Stagg is noted as a 'contributor' if he was one of a group of individuals responsible for a given innovation.

 Ends-back formation (1890)
 Reverse play (1890)
 7–2–2 defense (1890)
 First indoor game (1891)
 First book on football with diagrams (1893; with Minnesota's Henry Williams)
 First intersectional game (1894)
 center snap (1894; John Heisman and Walter Camp claimed to have invented it in 1893)
 onside kick (1894; possibly contributor)
 huddle (1896)
 quick kick (1896)
 Short punt (1896)
 Spiral snap (1896; contributor alongside Walter Camp, George Washington Woodruff and Germany Schulz) 
 line shift (1897)
 placement kick (1897; Stagg believed Princeton used it earlier)
 lateral pass (1898)
 tackling dummy (1899)
 unbalanced line (1900)
 Notre Dame Box (1905)
 varsity letters (1906)
 Statue of Liberty play (1908)
 uniform numbers (1913)
 T formation (contributor)
 forward pass (contributor alongside Eddie Cochems and Walter Camp)
 man in motion
 sleeper play
 quarterback keeper
 delayed buck
 linebacker position
 hip pads
 numerical designation of plays
 padded goalposts
 end-around

Coaching tree
In addition to Stagg's championships and innovations, another aspect of his legacy is in his players and assistant coaches who went on to become head football and basketball coaches at other colleges and universities across the countries.

Played under:
 Walter Camp

Assistant coaches who became head coaches:
 John Anderson: Knox (1917), Rice (1918) (also played under Stagg at Chicago)
 Hugo Bezdek: Oregon (1906, 1913–1916), Arkansas (1908–1912), Penn State (1918–1929), Cleveland Rams (1937–1938) (also played under Stagg at Chicago)
 Fritz Crisler: Minnesota (1930–1931), Princeton (1932–1937), Michigan (1938–1947) (also played under Stagg at Chicago)
 Ira Davenport: Columbia (IA) (1920–1921)
 Leo DeTray: Ole Miss (1912), Knox (1915–1916)
 Clarence Herschberger: Lake Forest (1902–1904) (also played under Stagg at Chicago)
 Harlan Page: Butler (1920–1925), Indiana (1926–1930), College of Idaho (1936–1937) (also played under Stagg at Chicago)
 James M. Sheldon: Indiana (1905–1913) (also played under Stagg at Chicago)
 Frederick A. Speik: Purdue (1908–1909) (also played under Stagg at Chicago)
 Amos Alonzo Stagg Jr.: Susquehanna (1935–1954) (also played under Stagg at Chicago)
 Paul Stagg: Moravian (1934–1936), Springfield (1937–1940), Worcester Tech (1941–1946), Pacific (1947–1960) (also played under Stagg at Chicago)
 Wayne Hardin: Navy (1959–1964), Philadelphia Bulldogs (1966), Temple (1970–1982) (also played under Stagg at Pacific)
 Larry Siemering: Pacific (1947–1950), Arizona State (1951), Calgary Stampeders (1954)

Former players who went on to become head coaches 
 W. J. Keller: Vanderbilt (1893) (played for Stagg at Springfield)
 Art Badenoch: Rose Poly (1906), New Mexico A&M (1910–1913)
 William Boone (American football): Hillsdale (1906)
 Mark Catlin Sr.: Iowa (1906–1908), Lawrence (1909–1918, 1924–1927)
 Maurice Gordon Clarke: Texas (1899), Western Reserve (1900), Washington (1901)
 Paul Des Jardien: Oberlin (1916)
 Campbell Dickson: Beloit (1928), Hamilton (1942)
 Ivan Doseff: Kalamazoo (1910), Iowa State Normal (1919–1920), Luther (1921–1922)
 Daniel Dougherty: Grinnell (1909)
 Shorty Ellsworth: Colorado Mines (1904–1907)
 A. A. Ewing: Northwestern (1894)
 J. C. Ewing: Colorado College (1900–1901), Baylor (1902)
 Frederick Feil: Wabash (1901)
 Sherman W. Finger: Cornell (IA) (1907–1923)
 Charles Firth: VPI (1897), Hillsdale (1913)
 Charles G. Flanagan: Morningside (1902)
 Ralph C. Hamill: Centre (1900)
 Jesse Harper: Alma (1906–1907), Wabash (1909–1912), Notre Dame (1913–1917)
 James R. Henry: DePauw (1902), Vanderbilt (1903)
 Frank E. Hering: Notre Dame (1896–1898)
 A. C. Hoffman: Ripon (1911), Tulane (1913)
 Tony Hinkle: Butler (1926, 1935–1941, 1946–1969), Great Lakes Navy (1942–1943)
 A. F. Holste: Wisconsin–Whitewater (1900), Denison (1902), Rose Poly (1903), Fairmount (1904), Hastings (1908–1910?, 1922–1925)
 Harold Iddings: Miami (OH) (1909–1910), Simpson (1911–1913), Otterbein (1916), Penn (IA) (1921)
 Thomas Kelley: Muhlenberg (1911–1913), Missouri Mines (1914), Alabama (1915–1917), Idaho (1920–1921), Missouri (1922)
 Walter S. Kennedy: Albion (1904–1920)
 E. Pratt King: Delaware (1907)
 Elmer A. Lampe: Carleton (1932–1933)
 Lester Larson: Texas A&M (1907), Louisville (1912–1913)
 Fred Luehring: Ripon (1906–1909)
 Walter E. Marks: Indiana State (1927–1930, 1933–1941, 1946–1948)
 Hal Mefford: Rose Poly (1916), Kendall (1917)
 Ned Merriam: Texas A&M (1908)
 Theron W. Mortimer: Colorado (1900), Alma (1901)
 Nelson Norgren: Utah (1914–1917)
 Norman C. Paine: Baylor (1913), Arkansas (1917–1918), Iowa State (1920)
 Ed Parry: Oklahoma A&M (1907–1908)
 Alfred W. Place: Buchtel (1903)
 Raymond L. Quigley: Northern Normal and Industrial (1910–1911), Arizona (1912)
 Charles M. Rademacher: Idaho (1915), St. Louis (1917, 1919–1920)
 Joseph Raycroft: Lawrence (1894), Stevens Point Normal (1895–1896)
 Clarence W. Russell: West Virginia (1907), Colorado Mines (1908), New Mexico A&M (1914–1916)
 A. G. Scanlon: Purdue (1918–1920)
 Lewis D. Scherer: Nebraska State Normal (1907–1908), Baker (1910–1912)
 Walter Steffen: Carnegie Tech (1914–1932)
 Herman Stegeman: Beloit (1915), Monmouth (1916–1917), Georgia (1920–1922)
 John Webster Thomas: Haskell (1927–1928)
 John F. Tobin: Tulane (1905)
 Mysterious Walker: Utah Agricultural (1907-1908), Williams (1917), New York Agricultural (1919), DePauw (1921), Drury (1924-1925), Wheaton (1936-1939)
 Horace Whiteside: Earlham (1914–1916)
 Sherburn Wightman: Massillon Tigers (1906), All-Massillons (1907), Dover Giants (1908)
 Ralph H. Young: DePauw (1915), Kalamazoo (1916–1917, 1919–1922), Michigan State (1923–1927)

Head coaching record

College football

College basketball

See also
 List of college football coaches with 200 wins
 List of college football coaches with 100 losses
 List of college football coaches with 20 ties

References

Books

External links

 University of Chicago profile
 
 
 
 
 
 Guide to the Amos Alonzo Stagg Papers 1866-1964 at the University of Chicago Special Collections Research Center
 

1862 births
1965 deaths
19th-century players of American football
All-American college football players
American centenarians
American football ends
American football fullbacks
American football halfbacks
American Olympic coaches
American vegetarianism activists
Baseball coaches from New Jersey
Basketball coaches from New Jersey
Chicago Maroons athletic directors
Chicago Maroons baseball coaches
Chicago Maroons football coaches
Chicago Maroons football players
Chicago Maroons men's basketball coaches
Coaches of American football from New Jersey
College Football Hall of Fame inductees
College track and field coaches in the United States
High school football coaches in Massachusetts
Junior college football coaches in the United States
Men centenarians
Naismith Memorial Basketball Hall of Fame inductees
Pacific Tigers football coaches
People associated with physical culture
People from West Orange, New Jersey
Phillips Exeter Academy alumni
Player-coaches
Players of American football from New Jersey
Springfield Pride football coaches
Springfield Pride football players
Susquehanna River Hawks football coaches
Yale Bulldogs baseball players
Yale Bulldogs football players
Yale Divinity School alumni
Players of American football from Chicago
Players of American football from Stockton, California